Wallace and Gromit's Cracking Contraptions is a British series of ten Wallace and Gromit stop-motion animations varying in length from 1 to 3 minutes. Each episode features one of Wallace's new inventions and Gromit's skeptical reaction to it.  The series was produced and released in 2002 by Aardman Animations. All ten shorts were aired on BBC One after the television premiere of Chicken Run (2000).

The idea for Cracking Contraptions came about when Japanese broadcasters were desperate for new material and asked if there were any shorts they could air on TV.

This was the first Wallace and Gromit production in widescreen.

Episode descriptions

Shopper 13
Because no dogs are allowed into the shop, Wallace deploys a remote-controlled trolley equipped with a camera and accessories to retrieve cheese from it and carry it home. Though it successfully picks up the largest wheel of Edam in the shop, the weight causes one wheel to fall off. Gromit guides it to grab a loaf of French bread, which it uses as a crutch to limp home. The other wheel comes off at the front door, stopping the trolley and, in the process, dumping the Edam in the garden. Wallace sends Shaun the Sheep to bring it in, but Shaun begins eating the cheese instead. Wallace keeps calling Gromit, who is still in the basement, to stop Shaun, but Gromit, disgusted and not wanting to get involved, ignores Wallace while Shaun happily munches away on the cheese (alluding to the final scene in A Close Shave). This short contains numerous references to NASA, especially the Apollo 13 mission.

The Autochef
To avoid the necessity for cooking, Wallace activates the Autochef, a robot chef equipped with a tea nozzle, frying pan and blender. He has it cook scrambled eggs, but they end up on Gromit's head instead of a plate (Gromit clearly suspects something like this will happen as he has donned a sou’wester to protect himself). Wallace decides he will have fried eggs, but the Autochef throws them onto Wallace's eyes which blinds him. It then starts to squirt hot tea around the room saying nonsense. Gromit blocks the nozzle with a banana skin, which makes the Autochef shout more nonsense, getting faster and louder as the pressure increases, saying different phases. Finally, after a brief pause it declares "Knickers!” and explodes, destroying the dining room in the process. A weary Wallace resigns himself to having a continental breakfast the following day.

A Christmas Cardomatic
Wallace has built a machine to make Christmas cards, with a camera hooked up to take the pictures for them. He has set up a crudely built snowy landscape in the living room, and Gromit - dressed in a bird costume - is reluctantly posing for the pictures. Wallace is pleased with the results, then hoists the backdrop away and walks off, not noticing the picturesque winter scene outside the window. The birds perched out there wave to Gromit, and one blows a party noisemaker at him when Wallace calls out for him to lick the stamps.

The Tellyscope
To activate the TV set without leaving his chair, Wallace launches a tennis ball into a hole in the wall. It triggers a mechanism that extends the TV across the room on a telescoping shaft, so that Wallace can reach the on/off and channel buttons. When he accidentally tunes into the wrong program, he finds that he has no more balls available; Gromit hands him the TV remote, but he throws it into the hole instead of using it normally. The remote jams the mechanism, causing the TV to shoot across the room and pin Wallace to the wall.

The Snowmanotron
For the annual Grand Snowman Competition, Gromit is building a snowman that depicts Wallace as Rodin's "The Thinker", but is interrupted by the arrival of Wallace with his new Snowmanotron machine. It builds a crude snowman and crushes the body of Gromit's creation, whose head falls off in his paws. An annoyed Gromit goes back into the house, slamming the door hard enough to dump a load of snow off the roof and onto Wallace so that it covers him completely. Realising that he now has a better-looking snowman than before, Gromit adds a carrot nose and eyes. He wins the competition, with Wallace catching a cold, having to thaw out at home, and saying "Well done, Gromit. But I thought that snowman was abominable!”.

The Bully Proof Vest
On a stormy night, Wallace nervously ventures into the kitchen to get his tea, not noticing a figure that hides in the shadows. He sits down to eat a cracker, only for it to be snatched out of his hand and reappear in a cupboard. The figure turns out to be Gromit, who advances on him threateningly with a rolling pin, but Wallace activates the Bully Proof Vest strapped to his chest. A spring-loaded boxing glove pops out, knocking Gromit across the room and through a door, and Wallace declares the invention a success. However, he trips on the rolling pin and falls, triggering the vest so that it launches him upward with enough force to embed him in the ceiling.

The 525 Crackervac
To speed up Gromit's chores of sweeping, Wallace activates the 525 Crackervac, a vacuum cleaner with sharp metal teeth that can suck up cracker crumbs at high speed. When it starts trying to snatch a packet of Wallace's crackers, he yanks the box away and throws it to Gromit, who eventually lassos the machine and rides it like a rodeo bull. Gromit ties a knot in its suction hose, causing the rear end to burst and get both Wallace and the area of the room around him coated in dirt. He then disgustedly asks Gromit to get the dustpan and brush that Gromit had been using at the start.

The Turbo Diner
While trying to repair the Autochef, Wallace tries a new contraption, the ceiling-mounted Turbo Diner. After inserting a 10p coin into the electric meter, he and Gromit sit at the table. The device clamps their wrists and ankles to their chairs with spiked protection bands on their wrists and spiked protection leg bracelets on their ankles whilst a powerful vacuum sucks all the debris off the table, after which another mechanism sets it and delivers a piping-hot meal. The energy required to do this severely depletes the meter and as the machine lights the candles (with a typically over-the-top flame thrower) the meter runs out leaving the pair clamped to their chairs, unable to move. It also results in a power outage. After the candles burn out leaving the pair in darkness, Wallace says, "Don't worry, I've got a great idea", in homage to The Italian Job.

The Snoozatron
Wallace can't sleep after eating too much cheese, so he activates his Snoozatron to remedy the problem. The device wakes up Gromit, who puts on a sheep costume and heads downstairs; meanwhile, robot arms fluff Wallace's mattress and pillow, place a hot water bottle on his chest, and give him a teddy bear as a record of lullaby music starts playing. After Gromit reaches the dining room, a huge spring built into the floor repeatedly bounces him upward, through a trap door in the ceiling, and into Wallace's bedroom. Wallace literally counts sheep and soon falls asleep, as the mechanism continues to bounce Gromit, who gets bored and starts reading the newspaper.

The Soccamatic
Wallace and Gromit head to the local football field for a bit of practice, with Wallace shooting and Gromit playing goalie. Frustrated at the ease with which Gromit blocks every shot, Wallace activates his Preston North End Soccamatic, a machine that kicks dozens of balls toward the goal. Gromit ducks to avoid the barrage, but when Wallace stops to load in more balls, he dons a vest and gloves that inflate to completely block the goal. Wallace suggests that they switch to tennis; after the credits, he serves a ball that bounces off Gromit's vest, then calls out, "15-love!"

Releases

Television broadcast 
Episodes were broadcast individually on BBC One throughout the Christmas period, 2002. All ten episodes were later aired as a 25-minute compilation on BBC Three during Christmas 2008, shortly before The Curse of the Were-Rabbit premiered on BBC One.

Home media 
They were subsequently released on a limited edition VHS and Region 2 DVD by Momentum Pictures. The series was also included as a bonus feature on some DVD releases, such as Wallace & Gromit in Three Amazing Adventures; Wallace & Gromit: The Curse of the Were-Rabbit; and can be found on the Walmart exclusive DVD, Gromit's Tail-Waggin' DVD, packaged with The Curse of the Were-Rabbit. Cracking Contraptions was also included as a bonus feature on the Wallace and Gromit: The Complete Collection Blu-ray.

Other 
Episodes first appeared on the internet for free viewing 15 October 2002, and the entire series for paid subscribers 21 October 2002 – July 2003. Starting April 2003 Microsoft sponsored free viewing of individual episodes, one per week. Christmas Cardomatic was viewable free in December 2003.

The series is now available free online on the Aardman YouTube channel, as well as the Wallace and Gromit YouTube channel.

The episodes appeared as comic strips in the 2010 Wallace and Gromit Annual.

Some of the stories featured have been converted into the series that ran on the United States on the ABC Family Network in April 9, 2003 to March 29, 2006.

References

External links
 
 
 Wallace & Gromit's Cracking Contraptions on the BBC website
 Wallace & Gromit's Cracking Contraptions on YouTube

Wallace and Gromit
Clay animation films
Stop-motion animated short films
BBC Television shows
Television series by Aardman Animations
2002 films
2002 short films
2002 animated films
2000s stop-motion animated films
Films set in Lancashire
2000s English-language films
2000s British films